Sandvollan is a former municipality in the old Nord-Trøndelag county, Norway. The  municipality existed from 1907 until its dissolution in 1962. It was located in the north part of what is now the municipality of Inderøy in Trøndelag county. There are two main villages in Sandvollan: Gangstad and Småland. Gangstad has a grocery store. Between the two villages lies Skjelvågen, a harbour that used to be a stop on the steam ship routes.

Sandvollan bordered the Sparbu area of the municipality of Steinkjer and the Børgin fjord to the east, the municipality of Inderøy to the southwest, and the Trondheimsfjord to the north.

There were two churches in the municipality of Sandvollan: the 12th-century Hustad Church and Heggstad Church from 1887. The older church was built for the chieftain of Hustad, Bård Standale, who was sheriff for Eystein Haraldsson around 1150. The newer church was built because the old one had become too small.

History
The municipality of Hustad was established on 1 January 1907 when the old municipality of Inderøy was divided into three municipalities: Røra (population: 866) in the southeast, Hustad (population: 732) in the north, and Inderøy (population: 2,976) in the west. In 1912, the name was changed to Sandvollan. During the 1960s, there were many municipal mergers across Norway due to the work of the Schei Committee. On 1 January 1962, the three neighboring municipalities of Røra (population: 1,003), Sandvollan (population: 750), and Inderøy (population: 3,194) to form a new, larger municipality of Inderøy.

Name
The municipality was originally named Hustad from 1907 until 1912. It was named after the old Hustad farm since the first Hustad Church was built there. In 1912, the municipal name was changed to Sandvollan which is an old name in the area. The first element comes from the word  which means "sandy ground".

Government
While it existed, this municipality was responsible for primary education (through 10th grade), outpatient health services, senior citizen services, unemployment, social services, zoning, economic development, and municipal roads. During its existence, this municipality was governed by a municipal council of elected representatives, which in turn elected a mayor.

Municipal council
The municipal council  of Sandvollan was made up of 13 representatives that were elected to four year terms. The party breakdown of the final municipal council was as follows:

Mayors
The mayors of Sandvollan:

 1907–1919: Tørris Hustad (V)
 1920–1922: Kristian Sletvold (V)
 1923–1925: Ole Stornes (Bp)
 1926–1928: Petter Heggstad (Bp)
 1929–1931: Ole Stornes (Bp)
 1932–1934: Sivert Bragstad (Bp)
 1935–1937: Ole Stornes (Bp)
 1938–1941: Lars Overrein (Bp)
 1941–1945: Petter Heggstad (NS)
 1945-1945: Lars Overrein (Bp)
 1946–1957: Oluf B. Meistad (Ap)
 1958–1959: Håkon A. Hustad (Ap)
 1960–1961: Andreas Nygård (Ap)

See also
List of former municipalities of Norway

References

Inderøy
Former municipalities of Norway
1907 establishments in Norway
1962 disestablishments in Norway